Campos–Bartolomeu Lysandro Airport  is the airport serving Campos dos Goytacazes, Brazil. It is named after the Congressman Bartholomeu Lysandro de Albernaz (1899–1965), a local plantation owner in whose land, the Fazenda Bonsucesso, the airport was built.

It is operated by Infra Construtora e Serviços.

History
It was opened on October 19, 1952.

The airport has a total area of 949,114.04 m2 and its passenger terminal has an area of 459 m2. The apron is capable of holding up to 6 aircraft.

On October 11, 2013, the administration of the airport was transferred from Infraero to the municipality of Campos dos Goytacazes, and on January 18, 2019, Infra Construtora e Serviços won from the Municipality a 30-year concession to operate the facility.

Airlines and destinations

Access

See also

List of airports in Brazil

References

External links

Airports in Rio de Janeiro (state)
Airports established in 1952